Luke James L. Scott (born 1 May 1968) is a British film, commercial and television director. He was second unit director on Exodus: Gods and Kings and The Martian, both directed by his father, Sir Ridley Scott. He made his feature film directorial debut in 2016 with Morgan.

Career 
In 2014, Luke worked as a second unit director on his father's biblical epic film Exodus: Gods and Kings, which starred Christian Bale and Joel Edgerton. The film was released on 12 December 2014 by 20th Century Fox, grossing $268 million with a budget of $140 million. Scott worked as second unit director again with his father on The Martian (2015).

Scott made his feature film directorial debut on the science fiction thriller Morgan. His father Ridley produced the film. Morgan starred Kate Mara, and was released by 20th Century Fox in September 2016. In February 2017, 20th Century Fox released the Alien: Covenant prologue short film entitled Last Supper directed by Scott in collaboration with the design consultant firm 3AM.

Personal life 
Luke is the son of director-producer Sir Ridley Scott and Felicity Heywood, and brother of Jake Scott and half-brother of Jordan Scott, both directors.

Filmography 
As director

Second unit director
 Exodus: Gods and Kings (2014)
 The Martian (2015)

Art director
 1492: Conquest of Paradise (1992)

References

External links 
 

1968 births
Living people
Place of birth missing (living people)
English film directors
English television directors
Luke